The 1967–68 Drexel Dragons men's basketball team represented Drexel Institute of Technology during the 1967–68 men's basketball season. The Dragons, led by 16th year head coach Samuel Cozen, played their home games at Sayre High School and were members of the College–Southern division of the Middle Atlantic Conferences (MAC).

Samuel Cozen stepped down from the head coach position during the season on January 31 due to medial issues.  The team was 10–2 at time.  He was replaced by interim head coach Robert Morgan who finished the season 2–7 as the head coach.

The team finished the season 12–9.

Roster

Schedule

|-
!colspan=9 style="background:#F8B800; color:#002663;"| Regular season
|-

|-
!colspan=9 style="background:#F8B800; color:#002663;"| 1968 Middle Atlantic Conference men's basketball tournament

References

Drexel Dragons men's basketball seasons
Drexel
1967 in sports in Pennsylvania
1968 in sports in Pennsylvania